Dayton Featherstone "Dates" Fryberger (born May 5, 1940) is an American former ice hockey forward and Olympian.

Fryberger played with Team USA at the 1964 Winter Olympics held in Innsbruck, Austria. He previously played for the Panthers at Middlebury College in Vermont.

Awards and honors

References

1940 births
Living people
Ice hockey players at the 1964 Winter Olympics
Olympic ice hockey players of the United States
Middlebury Panthers men's ice hockey players
American men's ice hockey forwards
AHCA Division I men's ice hockey All-Americans